Charles Borner House (January 1, 1913 – February 1, 2001), nicknamed "Red", was an American Negro league third baseman in the 1930s and 1940s.

A native of Holly Springs, Mississippi, House played for the Detroit Stars in 1937, and later played for the Homestead Grays in 1945. In 25 recorded career games, he posted 23 hits in 98 plate appearances. House died in River Rouge, Michigan in 2001 at age 88.

References

External links
 and Seamheads

1913 births
2001 deaths
Detroit Stars (1937) players
Homestead Grays players
Baseball third basemen
Baseball players from Mississippi
People from Holly Springs, Mississippi